Jens Eckardt (born 11 July 1968) is a Danish sailor. He competed in the Laser event at the 1996 Summer Olympics.

References

External links
 

1968 births
Living people
Danish male sailors (sport)
Olympic sailors of Denmark
Sailors at the 1996 Summer Olympics – Laser
Sportspeople from Copenhagen